Gyula Bóbis (7 October 1909 – 24 January 1972) was a Hungarian heavyweight wrestler. He competed at the 1936 Olympics in the Greco-Roman and at the 1948 Olympics in the freestyle division and won a gold medal in 1948. He also won a silver medal at the 1950 World Championships and bronze medals at the 1937 and 1939 European championships.

Bóbis was born in a family of eight siblings and later had five children himself, including the Olympic fencer Ildikó Farkasinszky-Bóbis. He worked for Hungarian railways and was an avid singer. While being a large and brave man he had a fear of mice.

References

1909 births
1972 deaths
People from Kecskemét
Olympic wrestlers of Hungary
Wrestlers at the 1936 Summer Olympics
Wrestlers at the 1948 Summer Olympics
Hungarian male sport wrestlers
Olympic gold medalists for Hungary
Olympic medalists in wrestling
Medalists at the 1948 Summer Olympics
Sportspeople from Bács-Kiskun County
20th-century Hungarian people